USS S-7 (SS-112) was a second-group ( or "Government") S-class submarine of the United States Navy. Her keel was laid down on 29 January 1918 by the Portsmouth Navy Yard. She was launched on 5 February 1920 sponsored by Mrs. Henry L. Wyman, and commissioned on 1 July 1920.

S-7 sailed from New London, Connecticut on 18 November 1920 to rendezvous with S-boats of Submarine Division 18 (SubDiv 18) and her own division — SubDiv 12 — off New Hampshire. They proceeded via the Panama Canal to Hawaii, arriving at Pearl Harbor on 15 April 1921. Departing Pearl Harbor on 3 November, they reached Cavite, Luzon, Philippine Islands, on 1 December. This was the longest cruise on record, at that time, for American submarines.

S-7 remained in the Philippines over the next three years except for annual spring visits to Shanghai, Chefoo, Chinwangtao, Amoy, Tsingtao, and Woosung, China. She finally departed Cavite on 29 October 1924 for Mare Island, California, arriving there on 30 December.

S-7 remained at Mare Island through 1925 and operated along the West Coast in 1926, mainly at San Francisco, San Pedro Submarine Base-San Pedro, and San Diego, California. Sailing from San Francisco on 17 February 1927, she operated in the Panama Canal area from March–April, arrived at New London on 3 May, and spent the rest of the year operating along the New England coast. S-7 served in the Panama Canal area from February–April 1928, from January–April 1929, and from January–March 1930, with the remainder of those years in the northeast.

Departing New London on 22 October, S-7 was decommissioned at Philadelphia, Pennsylvania, on 3 April 1931, and was struck from the Naval Vessel Register on 25 January 1937.

References

Ships built in Kittery, Maine
S-07
1920 ships